The 1958–59 North Dakota Fighting Sioux men's ice hockey team represented the University of North Dakota in college ice hockey. In its 2nd year under head coach Bob May the team compiled a 20–10–1 record and reached the NCAA tournament for the second time. The Fighting Sioux defeated Michigan State 4–3 in overtime to win the championship game at the RPI Field House in Troy, New York, the first national title hosted by an eastern school.

Season
Coming off of their first trip to the NCAA tournament, North Dakota was hoping to improve on their Runner-Up finish. First, however, the Fighting Sioux had to deal with the collapse of their conference. While programs like North Dakota and Denver had fully embraced the blueprint that Michigan had lain down by recruiting mostly overaged Canadian players, Minnesota head coach John Mariucci had made it a policy for his team to stick with American players and soon found his team left behind. Rather than join the rest of the teams Minnesota withdrew from the WIHL, taking Michigan and Michigan State with them to form the ice hockey division of the Big Ten. Rather than form a small conference of their own the remaining four teams played as independents for the 1958–59 season.

Despite being without a conference North Dakota played a very similar schedule to the one they had the year before. They still played each of the 6 other former WIHL teams and divided their time fairly evenly at home and on the road. After opening the season with two wins against the senior Winnipeg Maroons, North Dakota hit the road and split a pair of game at Michigan State. They returned home to take on Denver in a rematch of last season's national championship and took both close contests 4–3 with one win coming in extra time. After jumping out to a 5-1 start the Fighting Sioux slumped over the holiday break, tying then losing to the US National Team before dropping a match on the road with the Warroad Lakers. They lost their next game at home to Michigan Tech before finally stemming the tide with an overtime win the next night. Sporting a pedestrian 5-4-1 record UND went on an extended road trip through the great lakes.

The team's first stop was in Duluth where they took both games against an inferior Bulldogs squad. Afterwards they headed Ann Arbor and in the first game against the Wolverines the Fighting Sioux were beating up the home team so badly that the crowd couldn't contain themselves and ended up getting into a fight with the visitors. The game was stopped with 5:20 left in the third period and the remainder of the time was cancelled. The next night was a bit more subdued but North Dakota dropped the contest 2–4. After taking a week off the team returned to the area to take on Minnesota and Michigan Tech, splitting both series and beginning a six-game homestand with a respectable 11-7-1 record.

North Dakota welcomed Colorado College and won both games against the once-fearsome Tigers. After splitting yet another series against Michigan State the Fighting Sioux finished their home schedule with a pair of wins against Minnesota. For their final weekend North Dakota headed to Colorado to face the Pioneers and Tigers twice each in a 5-day span. Despite fatigue and elevation North Dakota acquitted themselves well by splitting both series and ending with an 18-10-1 record.

With the dissolution of the WIHL the NCAA selection committee had to use a new metric to determine which two western team would make the tournament. In the end they settled on using a similar method to how they choose eastern teams; they gave the top seed to the Big Ten Champion, Michigan State, then picked the best remaining team as the second semifinalist. While Michigan Tech had split its series with North Dakota during the season they finished with a worse record. Denver, on the other hand, ended with a stellar 22-5-1 mark and possessed the best offense in the country. There was, however, a problem. While most teams had a relatively balanced schedule, Denver had played only five of its 26 games on the road. Additionally, three of those game came against Colorado College. This meant that during the entire season Denver left their state only once and when they did they lost both game against North Dakota. Because of Denver's rather sizable home ice advantage their schedule was seen as far less strenuous than the Fighting Sioux's. In the end it may have been UND's 3–1 record against the Pioneers that tipped the scales in their favor but in any event North Dakota was awarded the second western seed, much to the displeasure of the Denver faithful.

North Dakota headed to the eastern time zone for the first time all season to take on Tri-State League champion St. Lawrence. The Saints battled the Fighting Sioux to a 3-3 tie after regulation and were hoping to head to their first National Title in their fourth appearance but a goal by UND's Guy LaFrance sent the Fighting Sioux back to the championship game. In the other semifinal Michigan State dropped Boston College by an identical 4–3 score, though they didn't require extra time. In the fifth meeting that season the Spartans opened the scoring in a close-checking first period, ending with a one-goal advantage due to an Ed Pollesel marker. In the second period North Dakota found their legs and completely took the game over, outshooting MSU 17–4 and outscoring their opponent 3–0. Once the third period began the pendulum swung completely in the other direction and it was Sparty's turn to take over, scoring twice in the final twelve minutes of play to tie the game and send the national championship into overtime. North Dakota hadn't lost an overtime game in over two years and head coach Bob May confessed to being nervous about that statistic. His team may have picked up on that because they didn't record a shot for more than four minutes but when they did they made it count and Reg Morelli scored to give the Fighting Sioux their first national title.

Morelli was awarded the tournament MOP and was joined by Ed Thomlinson on the All-Tournament first team while Ralph Lyndon and Joe Poole appeared on the second team.

Bill Steenson was the only player on the team to find his way onto the AHCA All-American West Team and while Bob May received a great deal of support for the Spencer Penrose Award the trophy went to Harry Cleverly.

After the season May left the team to coach minor professional hockey for a year before entering dental school. The team was not left in the lurch, however, as assistant coach Barry Thorndycraft took over the reigns.

Standings

Schedule

|-
!colspan=12 style=";" | Regular Season

|- Troy, New York
!colspan=12 style=";" | 

† The game against Michigan on January 16 was ended with 5:20 remaining in the 3rd period due to a fight involving players and fans.

Roster and scoring statistics

Goaltending Statistics

1959 championship game

W1 Michigan State vs. W2 North Dakota

See also
1959 NCAA Division I Men's Ice Hockey Tournament
List of NCAA Division I Men's Ice Hockey Tournament champions

References

North Dakota Fighting Hawks men's ice hockey seasons
North Dakota
North Dakota
North Dakota
North Dakota
North Dakota